Rotem Erlich (רותם ארליך; born April 10, 1969) is an Israeli former basketball player, who played for Israel and in the Israeli Basketball Premier League.  In 1997 he was the Israeli Premier League Assists Leader.

Basketball career
He played the point guard position, and is 1.88 metres tall.

Erlich played in the Israeli Basketball Premier League. In 1997 he was the Israeli Premier League Assists Leader, with 5.2.

He played for Israel in the FIBA 1988 European Championship for Junior Men.

References

External links
Instagram page
Facebook page

Living people
1969 births
Israeli men's basketball players
Point guards
Israeli Basketball Premier League players